Francisco Dueñas Díaz (3 December 1810 – 4 March 1884) was a Salvadoran politician and member of the Conservative Party who served as President of El Salvador on four different occasions: 3 May 1851 to 30 January 1852, 1 February 1852 to 1 February 1854, 1 to 12 February 1856 in acting capacity, and 26 October 1863 to 15 April 1871.

He was "an ardent defender of the clerical interests. Dueñas at one time had taken the vows as a Dominican, but when the convents were closed in 1829, he left the cloister and secured a papal dispensation." Under his leadership, "the clerical party was in the ascendancy and El Salvador experienced a far-reaching Conservative reaction."

Personal life 

Francisco Dueñas Díaz was born on 3 December 1810 in San Salvador, El Salvador. His father was José Miguel Dueñas and his mother was Secundina Díaz. He married on Teresa Dárdano on 12 February 1866 and his ceremony was presided over by Bishop Tomás Pineda y Zaldaña. He had five children: Francisco, Carlos, Miguel, Pablo, and Antonia.

References 

Presidents of El Salvador
Vice presidents of El Salvador
1810 births
1884 deaths
People from San Salvador
19th-century Salvadoran people